Eidsvold is a rural town and locality in the North Burnett Region, Queensland, Australia. The town is the self-proclaimed Beef Capital of the Burnett and is a hub for the regional cattle industry.

Geography 

The highway passes through the locality from the south-east to the north-east, passing through the town's main street (Moreton Street). The Mungar Junction to Monto branch railway passes from south-east to north-east through the locality, roughly parallel to the highway; the Eidsvold railway station serves the town. The Eidsvold–Theodore Road (State Route 73) runs south and then west from the town.

History 
Wakka Wakka (Waka Waka, Wocca Wocca, Wakawaka) is an Australian Aboriginal language spoken in the Burnett River catchment. The Wakka Wakka language region includes the landscape within the local government boundaries of the North and South Burnett Regional Council, particularly the towns of Eidsvold, Cherbourg, Murgon, Kingaroy, Gayndah and Mundubbera.

The town is named for Eidsvold Station, a nearby property, that is named for Eidsvoll, Norway (using the pre-1918 spelling) where the Norwegian Constitution was signed in 1814. The station was given this name by the Archer brothers, Scottish settlers who also had land holdings in Norway. The Eidsvold run was licensed to Thomas Archer in June 1848.

The post office opened 19 September 1887.

The Church of the Nazarene established a congregation in Eidsvold in 1950 and built a timber church at 12 Moreton Street in 1953. However, the congregation declined and the church closed. The building was purchased by the local Uniting Church in Australia congregation, who had previously been meeting in the CWA rooms, and opened it as the Eidsvold Uniting Church on 23 February 1980.

Heritage listings
Eidsvold has a number of heritage-listed sites, including:

 Cemetery Road: Eidsvold No.1 Cemetery
 Eidsvold Road: Eidsvold Homestead
 22 Golden Spur Street: Dr Tom Bancroft's Laboratory
Hodgkinson Street: former Eidsvold Court House
Off Mount Rose Street: Eidsvold Goldfield (Mount Rose Mine)
Off Racecourse Road: Eidsvold Racecourse

Education 
Eidsvold State School is a government primary and secondary (Prep-12) school for boys and girls at 7 Hodgkinson Street. In 2017, the school had an enrolment of 92 students with 11 teachers and 12 non-teaching staff (8 full-time equivalent).

Amenities 
Eidsvold has an R. M. Williams Australian bush learning centre, historical museum and complex, swimming pool, showground and bowling and golf clubs.

The North Burnett Regional Council operate a public library at 36 Moreton Street.

The historical museum pays tribute to the 62 soldiers from the Eidsvold area that served in the First World War. Displays include photographs, medals and the Shire of Eidsvold Honour Board.

The Eidsvold branch of the Queensland Country Women's Association meets at the QCWA Hall at 40 Moreton Street.

Eidsvold Uniting Church is at 12 Moreton Street.

Notable residents 
 David and Thomas Archer, pioneer settlers
 Thomas Lane Bancroft, medical doctor, parasitologist, cotton breeder, naturalist, scientist
 Jim Burrows, Member of the Queensland Legislative Assembly
 Percy Byrnes, Member of the Victorian Legislative Council
 David Farrell, Member of the Queensland Legislative Assembly
 George Farrell, Member of the Queensland Legislative Assembly
 George Halford, Anglican bush brother and bishop of Rockhampton
 Lindsay Hartwig, (politician)
 Nev Hewitt, Member of the Queensland Legislative Assembly
 William Forster McCord, Member of the Queensland Legislative Assembly
 Lloyd McDermott, Australia's first indigenous barrister and Australian rugby union player
 Maureen Watson, Indigenous activist
 R. M. Williams, bushman and entrepreneur

References

External links

University of Queensland: Queensland Places: Eidsvold and Eidsvold Shire

Towns in Queensland
North Burnett Region
Localities in Queensland